Vanessa Guzmán Niebla (born April 19, 1976, in Mexico City, Mexico), is a Mexican actress and model. She was Nuestra Belleza México in 1995, and represented her country in the 1996 Miss Universe pageant.

Biography
Vanessa Guzmán was born in Mexico City, Mexico, and at age 4 moved with her family to Ciudad Juarez, Chihuahua, Mexico. In 1995, she competed for the title of Nuestra Belleza Chihuahua (Miss Chihuahua), title which she ended winning. After having won such title, she competed in Mexico's national beauty pageant Nuestra Belleza México; she was crowned Miss Mexico and went on to represent her country in Miss Universe 1996. She made the top six in the pageant and placed 5th overall. Just a short time after having returned from competing for the title, she received several offers to star in a number of television programs. She accepted the offer to co-host Al Ritmo de la Noche, alongside Jorge Ortiz de Pinedo.

In 1999 she received her first role as an actress in a telenovela; Tres Mujeres (1999), Carita de Ángel (2000), Siempre te Amaré (2000), Aventuras en el Tiempo and Entre el Amor y el Odio are a number of works the actress has participated in. Other works made by Guzmán include the radionovela La Herencia, as well as appearing Mi Mujer se llama Mauricio and the film  16 en la Lista. The actress married, then divorced, actor Eduardo Rodriguez, with whom she had a son. In 2004, she participated in the production of Lucero Suárez titled Amar Otra Vez, where she gave life to the character of Verónica. Her latest appearance was in Alborada (2005). In 2006, she traveled to Argentina, where she began working on a telenovela named Amor Mío. She returned to Argentina in 2007 to work on the second season of Amor Mío and married current husband Uberto Bondoni, with whom she had a boy in 2008. 
Vanessa recently appeared on the cover of the magazine H Para Hombres.

Filmography

References

External links
 

1976 births
Actresses from Mexico City
Living people
Mexican female models
Mexican telenovela actresses
Miss Universe 1996 contestants
Nuestra Belleza México winners